Henry Clay (1777–1852) was an American politician from Kentucky.

Henry Clay may also refer to:

Henry Clay Jr. (1811–1847), his son, American soldier and statesman
Henry Clay (steamboat), subject of the Hudson River's worst steamboat disaster, in Riverdale, the Bronx, New York, on July 28, 1852
Henry Clay High School, oldest public high school in Lexington, Kentucky
USS Henry Clay (SSBN-625), a Lafayette-class ballistic missile submarine
Henry Clay (cigar), a brand of cigars
Henry Clay (Niehaus), a 1929 bronze sculpture
Henry Clay (economist) (1883–1954), British economist and Warden of Nuffield College, Oxford
Henry Robinson Clay (1895–1919), World War I flying ace
Sir Henry Clay, 6th Baronet (1909–1985), English engineer
Henry Clay (rower) (born 1955), British Olympic rower
Henry Clay, Kentucky
Henry Clay Township, Fayette County, Pennsylvania, township in Fayette County, Pennsylvania
Henry Clay, Delaware, an unincorporated community in New Castle County, Delaware, United States
 Henry Clay, English inventor who patented a laminate sheet process for papier-mâché

See also
Harry Clay (disambiguation)
Clay family

Clay, Henry